Legislative elections were held in Mongolia in 1990. The State Great Khural was elected on 22 June 1990, with a second round on 29 June, at which time the Little Khural, the new second chamber, was also elected.

Background

In 1989 the Mongolian People's Republic witnessed a series of demonstrations against the government by the coalition group the Mongolian Democratic Union, a group formed on December 10 of that year by intellectuals under the influence of similar movements in Eastern Europe. Jambyn Batmönkh promised reform to placate the growing demonstrations and met with the MDU leaders, although Dumaagiin Sodnom and other leading Politburo members felt that a gradual five-year plan for reforms could be undertaken. Demonstrations continued however, with Batmönkh announcing his resignation on March 4, followed by the rest of the Politburo eight days later. Punsalmaagiin Ochirbat became chairman of the Hural with Sharavyn Gungaadorj appointed as Prime Minister, although it was agreed that the Hural would meet again in May to discuss constitutional change, making these appointments temporary.

The demonstrations continued, however, (largely as a consequence of the lack of funding and media access for the newly formed opposition parties in contrast to the Mongolian People's Revolutionary Party) and the army was used against the demonstrators in April. Meetings were held with the opposition on April 30 and free elections to the Hural were agreed on May 14.

Election campaign
The Mongolian People's Revolutionary Party (MPRP) registered as a political party on May 24 and others followed suit, including the Mongolian Democratic Party (1990), the Mongolian Green Party, the Mongolian National Progress Party and the Mongolian Social Democratic Party. However the MPRP soon took the lead by promising to cancel some debts, lower the cost of heating and provide higher wages for the poor and students. They combined this with the removal of their links to the security forces and army in order to prevent a threatened opposition boycott.

Primary elections were held on June 25 with 2,400 candidates put forward to chase 799 available full candidatures for the Great Hural's 430 seats. Ultimately around 100 opposition candidates advanced, with the system criticized for favouring rural areas where the MPRP were strongest.

Results
The MPRP took 60% of the vote but won 358 seats (86%), with the opposition only managing 14% of the seats despite winning 40% of the vote. Due to election irregularities, 28 seats were held up. As a consequence of the results, Punsalmaagiin Ochirbat was confirmed as President whilst Dashiin Byambasüren was appointed as Prime Minister. Gonchigdorj, leader of the small Mongolian Social Democrat Party, was appointed Vice president as part of an effort by the MPRP to cooperate with the opposition. Davaadorjiin Ganbold, prominent economist and the leader of the Mongolian National Progress Party was appointed as the Deputy Prime Minister.

People's Grand Khural

Little Khural

References

Elections in Mongolia
Mongolia
1990 in Mongolia
1990 election
Election and referendum articles with incomplete results